Prakasha Barrage Dam, is an earthfill dam on Tapi river in Nandurbar district of Maharashtra in India.

Specifications

Purpose
 Irrigation

See also
 Dams in Maharashtra
 List of reservoirs and dams in India

References

Dams in Maharashtra
Year of establishment missing